Becky Gardiner (born Rebeckah McCormick McLean; April 24, 1886) was an American screenwriter and actress active in the 1920s and 1930s. She was noted for writing screenplays that focused on women.

Biography 
Gardiner was born into a prominent Maryland family; her father, Donald McLean, was a lawyer, and his wife, Emily Nelson Ritchie, was related to Maryland Gov. Albert Ritchie. On June 12, 1909, she married writer John D.W. Gardiner; they had one daughter, Emily, who became an author as well.

Gardiner got her start as an actress in New York City, performing in small roles in the early 1910s under the name Becky Bruce. She turned her attention to writing in the 1920s, studying in Paris at the Sorbonne and writing a column called "Footlights and Studio Lamps" for The Evening Sun; she eventually went under contract at Famous Players–Lasky, where she was the only woman on the East Coast writing staff. She also worked at Fox and Paramount.

Films for which Gardiner wrote adaptations included Sea Horses (1926) and Padlocked (1926). She also wrote the scenario for War Nurse (1930).

Her date of death is unknown.

Selected filmography 

 Stingaree (1934)
 Coming Out Party (1934)
 Susan Lenox (Her Fall and Rise) (1931)
 A Free Soul (1931)
 War Nurse (1930)
 The Trial of Mary Dugan (1929)
 The Sin Sister (1929)
 Square Crooks (1928)
 Cabaret (1927)
 Love's Greatest Mistake (1927)
 New York (1927)
 The Great Gatsby (1926)
 Padlocked (1926)
 Sea Horses (1926)

References 

American women screenwriters
Writers from Baltimore
American film actresses
1886 births
Date of death missing
Screenwriters from Maryland
20th-century American actresses
Actresses from Baltimore